Georges Auguste Leroy (5 June 1870 – 22 December 1952) was a French fencer. He competed in the men's épée event at the 1900 Summer Olympics.

References

External links
 

1870 births
1952 deaths
French male épée fencers
Olympic fencers of France
Fencers at the 1900 Summer Olympics
Sportspeople from Caen